The Orange Bowl is an annual American college football bowl game played in the Miami metropolitan area. It has been played annually since January 1, 1935, making it, along with the Sugar Bowl and the Sun Bowl, one of the second-oldest bowl games in the country, behind only the Rose Bowl (first played 1902, played annually since 1916). The Orange Bowl is one of the New Year's Six, the top bowl games for the NCAA Division I Football Bowl Subdivision.

The Orange Bowl was originally held in the city of Miami at Miami Field before moving to the Miami Orange Bowl stadium in 1938. In 1996, it moved to Pro Player Stadium (now Hard Rock Stadium) in Miami Gardens, Florida. Since December 2014, the game has been sponsored by Capital One and officially known as the Capital One Orange Bowl. Previous sponsors include Discover Financial (2011–January 2014) and Federal Express/FedEx (1989–2010).

In its early years, the Orange Bowl had no defined conference tie-ins; it often pitted a team from the southeastern part of the country against a team from the central or northeastern states. From the 1950s until the mid-1990s, the Orange Bowl had a strong relationship with the Big Eight Conference.  The champion (or runner-up in years in which the “no-repeat” rule was invoked) was invited to the bowl game in most years during this time; the 1979 Orange Bowl even had two representatives from the Big Eight.  Opponents of the Big Eight varied; but were often major independents, runners-up in the Southeastern Conference (SEC), or champions of the Atlantic Coast Conference (ACC). Since 2007, the Orange Bowl has hosted the ACC champion—unless they are involved in the national championship playoff, in which case another high-ranking ACC team takes their place)—and has used the brand Home of the ACC Champion.

In the 1990s, the Orange Bowl was a member of the Bowl Coalition, but kept its Big Eight tie-in. It was later a member of the Bowl Alliance.  From 1998 to 2013, the Orange Bowl was a member of the now-defunct Bowl Championship Series (BCS). The Orange Bowl served as the BCS National Championship Game in 2001 and 2005. However, beginning with the 2006 season, the BCS National Championship Game became a stand-alone event, hosted by the local bowl organization about one week following the New Year's Day bowl games (including the Orange Bowl). Under that format, the Orange Bowl Committee hosted two separate games in both 2009 (the 2009 Orange Bowl on January 1 and the 2009 BCS National Championship Game on January 8) and in 2013 (the 2013 Orange Bowl on January 1 and the 2013 BCS National Championship Game on January 7), all at the same venue.  The BCS ended after the 2013 season, being replaced by the current College Football Playoff (CFP). The Orange Bowl has served as one of six bowls in the CFP since the 2014 season. In the years that it is not a national semifinal, the Orange Bowl is hosted by the ACC champion if that team is not one of the four top seeds for the CFP. The Orange Bowl hosted a national semifinal following the 2015, 2018, and 2021 seasons, and will next host one following the 2024 season.

History

Early roots
In 1890, Pasadena, California held its first Tournament of Roses Parade to showcase the city's mild weather compared to the harsh winters in northern cities. As one of the organizers said: "In New York, people are buried in snow. Here, our flowers are blooming and our oranges are about to bear. Let's hold a festival to tell the world about our paradise." In 1902, the annual festival was enhanced by adding an American football game.

In 1926, leaders in Miami, Florida, decided to do the same with a "Fiesta of the American Tropics" that was centered around a New Year's Day football game. Although a second "Fiesta" was never held, Miami leaders, including Earnest E. Seiler, later revived the idea with the "Palm Festival" (with the slogan "Have a Green Christmas in Miami").

Palm Festival Game
In 1932, George E. Hussey, official greeter of Miami, organized the first Festival of Palms Bowl, a predecessor of the Orange Bowl. With Miami suffering from both the Great Depression and the preceding Florida land bust, Hussey and other Miamians sought to help its economy by organizing a game similar to Pasadena's Rose Bowl.

Two games were played in this series at Moore Park in Miami, both pitting an invited opponent against a local team, the University of Miami. In the first game, played on January 2, 1933, Miami defeated Manhattan College 7–0. In the second game, played on New Year's Day 1934, Duquesne defeated Miami 33–7. Duquesne was coached by Elmer Layden, one of the Four Horsemen of Notre Dame.

These games are not recognized as bowl games by the NCAA because one team was guaranteed a berth regardless of record. However, following the success of these games, backers organized another game for New Year's Day 1935 under the Orange Bowl name. This game, unlike the Palm Festival Games, did not automatically grant a berth to one team, although the University of Miami was again a participant. For this reason, the 1935 Orange Bowl was later recognized by the NCAA as an official bowl game.

Modern game

The Orange Bowl was played at Miami Field (located where Miami Orange Bowl was later built) from 1935 to 1937, the Miami Orange Bowl from 1938 to 1996, and again in 1999, and was moved to its current site, Hard Rock Stadium in Miami Gardens, Florida, in December 1996. The game was played back at the namesake stadium in 1999 (which would be the final bowl game ever in the Miami Orange Bowl) because the game was played on the same day the Miami Dolphins hosted an NFL Wild Card Playoff game. Coincidentally, both of those games were aired on ABC.

On January 1, 1965, the Texas vs. Alabama Orange Bowl was the first college bowl game to be televised live in prime time.

From 1968, the game usually featured the champion of the former Big Eight Conference. When the Big Eight Conference absorbed four members of the defunct Southwest Conference in 1996, the newly formed Big 12 Conference moved its conference champion tie-in to the Fiesta Bowl. From 1998 to 2013, however, with the creation of the Bowl Championship Series system, team selection for the Orange Bowl was tied into the other three BCS Bowls and (from 2006 to 2013) the BCS National Championship Game.

From 1998 to 2005, the game hosted the champion of either the ACC or Big East conferences, unless they were invited to the National Championship game, or if the Orange Bowl itself was hosting the national championship matchup.

Starting with the 2006 season, the Orange Bowl has been exclusively tied with the ACC and has used the brand Home of the ACC Champion. As one of the Bowl Championship Series (BCS) bowl games, the site of the Orange Bowl also hosted the national championship game one week after the Orange Bowl game; it did so on a four-year rotating basis with the other three BCS games (the others being the Sugar, Fiesta, and Rose Bowls). The tie-in with the ACC continued with the inception of the College Football Playoff after the 2014 season. It hosts the ACC champion in the years that it is not a national semifinal, unless the ACC champion is selected for the College Football Playoff.

King Orange Jamboree Parade
From 1936 to 2001 (except for the World War II years), the Orange Bowl Committee also sponsored a parade. In its heyday, the parade was a nighttime New Year's Eve tradition, televised nationally with lighted floats and displays going down part of Biscayne Boulevard in downtown Miami to crowds as high as 500,000 people in the 1970s. However ratings dropped and the national television contract was lost in 1997, causing the parade to quickly become a shell of its former self since there were no sponsors for the elaborate floats. Attendance dwindled as well; by the turn of the millennium, the parade was lucky to draw 20,000 people. As a result, the committee chose to bring this tradition to an end in early 2002.

The very first King Orange Jamboree Parade was held the day before the 1936 game with 30 floats at an expense of $40,000 ($653,933 in 2012 dollars).  Babs Beckwith was chosen as the first Orange Bowl queen.

Conference tie-ins
The Atlantic Coast Conference (ACC) is locked into a 12-year deal (2014–2025) with the Orange Bowl, so if the ACC champion qualifies for the playoffs in a year when the Orange Bowl is not a semifinal host, the next-highest ranked ACC team will play in the Orange Bowl. For the secondary tie-ins, the Southeastern Conference (SEC) and the Big Ten Conference are guaranteed three appearances each, and the University of Notre Dame can play in a maximum of two games, but is not guaranteed any appearances. The ACC team's opponent in a given year will be the highest-ranked available team from the SEC, Big Ten, and Notre Dame, subject to several constraints: the SEC and Big Ten champions are always excluded, and when an SEC and/or Big Ten team qualifies for the College Football Playoff, the next available team would also be excluded from participating in the Orange Bowl due to contractual obligations with the Sugar Bowl and Rose Bowl, respectively. Also, should a highest-ranked team create a rematch with the ACC team, the Orange Bowl has the option of passing over that team for the next-highest ranked team among the Big Ten, SEC, and Notre Dame, again subject to the noted constraints. Rankings are based on the College Football Playoff committee's rankings. ESPN holds the television rights for 12 years as well.

Game results
Rankings are based on the AP Poll prior to the game being played.

Source:
 Denotes Bowl Coalition Championship Game
 Denotes Bowl Alliance Championship Game
 Denotes BCS National Championship Game
 Denotes College Football Playoff semifinal game
 Denotes a historical name for what is now Hard Rock Stadium
 Due to an NFL scheduling conflict, the 1999 game was played at the Miami Orange Bowl
 USC vacated their 2005 victory due to NCAA sanctions

Future games

 denotes game is a College Football Playoff semifinal

MVPs
The bowl first named an MVP in 1965. From 1970 through 1998, two MVPs were named for each game. Since 1999, only a single MVP is named, except when the game is part of the College Football Playoff, in which case both an offensive and defensive MVP are named.

 CFP semifinal

Most appearances
Updated through the December 2022 edition (89 games, 178 total appearances).

Teams with multiple appearances

Teams with a single appearance
Won (11): Bucknell, Catholic, Duquesne, Louisville, Rice, Santa Clara, Stanford, Tulsa, Washington, West Virginia, Wisconsin

Lost (14): Baylor, Boston College, Cincinnati, Georgetown, Holy Cross, Kentucky, Michigan State, Navy, North Carolina, Northern Illinois, Ole Miss, TCU, Virginia, Wake Forest

Appearances by conference
Updated through the December 2022 edition (89 games, 178 total appearances).

 Conferences that are defunct or not currently active in FBS appear in italics.
 Big Eight records include results when the conference was known as the Big Six and Big Seven.
 Pac-12 records include results when the conference was known as the Pacific-10.
 Multiple teams have played in the bowl as members of different conferences at different times:

Game records

Source:

Sponsorship
The game was previously officially known as the Discover Orange Bowl, since Discover Financial was announced as title sponsor on August 26, 2010, as part of a new four-year agreement. The game had been called the FedEx Orange Bowl from 1989 to 2010, as FedEx sponsored the event during that period. Starting with the 2010–11 season, ESPN carried the Orange Bowl, replacing Fox after four seasons. ABC aired the game from 1999 to 2006, with CBS (1995–1998) and NBC (1964–1994) previously carrying the game.

Discover stated that they would not renew their sponsorship of the game further on June 9, 2014; the game will be a part of the College Football Playoff in the future, and CFP rightsholder ESPN has asked for higher sponsorship fees, in return. On September 22, 2014, Capital One was announced as the new title sponsor of the Orange Bowl, transferring their bowl game sponsorship from the Citrus Bowl. Subsequently, the company's "Capital One Mascot Challenge" winner naming ceremony also moved to the Orange Bowl.

Broadcasting

ESPN is the current rightsholder of the Orange Bowl, a relationship that began in 2011 as part of the contract to broadcast the Bowl Championship Series games. In anticipation of the transition to the College Football Playoff in the 2014–15 season, ESPN reached a new deal with the game's organizers in November 2012 to extend its rights through 2026, paying $55 million yearly. The game is also broadcast nationally by ESPN Radio.

Prior to that, Fox held the rights to the event (along with the other BCS bowls) since 2007, preceded by ABC (1999–2006 and 1962–64), CBS (1996–98 and 1953–61), and NBC (1965–95). This game, along with the Fiesta Bowl, is one of only two bowl games ever to air on all the "big 4" U.S. television networks. ESPN Deportes added a Spanish language telecast of the game in 2013.

See also
 List of college bowl games

Notes

References

External links

 

 
College football bowls
Annual sporting events in the United States
Recurring sporting events established in 1935
1935 establishments in Florida
Capital One